Craig Shaw Gardner (born July 2, 1949) is an American author, best known for producing fantasy parodies similar to those of Terry Pratchett.

He was also a member of the Swordsmen and Sorcerers' Guild of America (SAGA), a loose-knit group of Heroic Fantasy authors founded in the 1960s, some of whose works were anthologized in Lin Carter's Flashing Swords! anthologies.

Bibliography

Series

Ebenezum
 A Malady of Magicks (1986)
 A Multitude of Monsters (1986)
 A Night in the Netherhells (1987)
 The Exploits of Ebenezum, omnibus

Wuntvor
 A Difficulty with Dwarves (1987)
 An Excess of Enchantments (1988)
 A Disagreement with Death (1989)
 The Wanderings of Wuntvor, omnibus

The Cineverse Cycle
 Slaves of the Volcano God (1989)
 Bride of the Slime Monster (1990)
 Revenge of the Fluffy Bunnies (1990)
 The Cineverse Cycle (1990),  The Cineverse Cycle Omnibus (1992)

The Sinbad series
 The Other Sinbad (1991)
 A Bad Day for Ali Baba (1992)
 Scheherazade's Night Out (1992), a.k.a. The Last Arabian Night (1993)

Dragon Circle
 Dragon Sleeping (1994), a.k.a. Raven Walking
 Dragon Waking (1995)
 Dragon Burning (1996)

The Changeling War
Written as Peter Garrison
 The Changeling War (1999)
 The Sorcerer's Gun (1999)
 The Magic Dead (2000)

Abbadon Inn
 Twisted Branch (2005), written as Chris Blaine
 Dark Whispers (2005), written as Chris Blaine
 Drowned Night (2005), written as Chris Blaine

Temporary Magic Series
 Temporary Monsters (2017)
 Temporary Hauntings (2017)

Collections
 The Purple Book of Peculiar Stories (2004)
 A Cold Wind in July (2012)

Novelizations
 The Lost Boys (1987)
 Wishbringer (1988)
 Batman (1989)
 Back to the Future Part II (1989)
 Back to the Future Part III (1990)
 Batman Returns with Sam Hamm and Daniel Waters (1992)
 The 7th Guest with Matthew J. Costello (1995)
 Leprechauns (1999)
 Jason and the Argonauts written in 2000 but not published

Non-film novels based on licensed properties
 The Batman Murders (1990)
 Spider-Man: Wanted Dead or Alive (1998)
 Return to Chaos (Buffy novel) (1998)
 Dark Mirror (Angel novel) (2004)
 Battlestar Galactica: The Cylons' Secret (2006)

References

External links
 
 
 
 Peter Garrison at LC Authorities, with 3 records

1949 births
Living people
20th-century American novelists
21st-century American novelists
American male novelists
American fantasy writers
20th-century American male writers
21st-century American male writers